Ornithocephalus falcatus is a species of orchid found from the Guianas, Venezuela, Ecuador, and Peru.

References

External links 

falcatus
Orchids of South America
Plants described in 1848